Hawaii's 1st congressional district is a congressional district in the U.S. state of Hawaii. The district is entirely on the island of Oahu, encompassing the urban areas of the City and County of Honolulu, a consolidated city-county that includes Oahu's central plains and southern shores, including the towns of Aiea, Mililani, Pearl City, Waipahu, and Waimalu. The district is smaller and more densely populated than the 2nd congressional district (which comprises the rest of the state). It is represented by Democrat Ed Case.

History
When Hawaii and Alaska were admitted to the Union in 1959, both new states were granted one at-large representative to Congress, pending the next United States Census. In the reapportionment following the 1960 U.S. Census, Hawaii gained a second U.S. representative. Instead of creating two congressional districts, the state continued to elect its representatives at large. Two representatives were first elected in 1962, and Hawaii was first represented by two U.S. representatives on January 2, 1963, upon the convening of the 88th Congress.

The 1st Congressional District was created in 1971, when Hawaii began electing its representatives from districts instead of electing at-large representatives statewide.

Election results from statewide races

List of members representing the district 

Election results

1970

1972

1974

1976

1978

1980

1982

1984

1986 (Special)

1986

1988

1990

1992

1994

1996

1998

2000

2002

2004

2006

2008

2010 (Special)

2010

2012

2014

2016 (Special)

2016

2018

2020

2022

See also

Hawaii's congressional districts
List of United States congressional districts

References

 Congressional Biographical Directory of the United States 1774–present

1